Dean Newman Askew (born 15 June 1962 in Hamilton) was a New Zealand cricketer who played first class cricket for Central Districts, and Auckland and also first class rugby for King County.  He subsequently played several cricket seasons in the Netherlands and the UK .

In February 2020, he was named in New Zealand's squad for the Over-50s Cricket World Cup in South Africa. However, the tournament was cancelled during the third round of matches due to the coronavirus pandemic.

See also
 List of Auckland representative cricketers

References

1962 births
Living people
New Zealand cricketers
Auckland cricketers
Central Districts cricketers
Cricketers from Hamilton, New Zealand